Małgorzata Pritulak (born 21 June 1947, Warsaw, Poland) is a Polish theatre and film actress.

In 1970, Pritulak graduated from the Theatre Academy in Warsaw.

She is the wife of actor , and has two sons: Przemysław and Franciszek.

Pritulak won the award for leading actress at the Gdynia Film Festival in 1974.

External links
 

1947 births
Living people
Actresses from Warsaw
20th-century Polish actresses